The European Network of Physiotherapy in Higher Education (ENPHE) is a non-profit association of leading physical therapy universities in Europe. ENPHE was set up in February 1995, with headquarters in Utrecht, Netherlands. The main objectives are to provide high quality physical therapy education in Europe and to improve links between association members in research, as well as postgraduate and continuing education.

References

External links
Official website

Physiotherapy organizations
College and university associations and consortia in Europe
International medical associations of Europe
Organisations based in Utrecht (city)